Svinkino is a rural locality (a village) in Slednevskoye Rural Settlement, Alexandrovsky District, Vladimir Oblast, Russia. The population was 4 as of 2010. There is 1 street.

Geography 
Svinkino is located on the Seraya River, 15 km northeast of Alexandrov (the district's administrative centre) by road. Temkino is the nearest rural locality.

References 

Rural localities in Alexandrovsky District, Vladimir Oblast